Gad's Hill School  in Higham, Kent, England, is an independent school for day pupils, founded in 1924. It is set in the former Gads Hill Place, the country home of Charles Dickens.

School history
Charles Dickens died in what is now the school conservatory, but was formerly the school refectory. Cedric Charles Dickens, the author's great-grandson, was a governor of the school until his death in 2006. Marion Dickens, the author's great-great-granddaughter, is a former pupil of the school and, as of 2019, is a Director of the school company.

As of 2013, the school was moving into purpose-built buildings in the grounds of the house.

Inspection judgements

As of 2018, the school's most recent inspection by the Independent Schools Inspectorate was in 2017. The school was judged to meet all the regulatory compliance standards and educational quality was judged as good.

Academic performance

In 2017, the school's Attainment 8 score at GCSE was 45, compared to 46 for the local authority as a whole and 45 for England.

References

External links
 School website

1924 establishments in England
Grade I listed buildings in Kent
Private schools in Kent
Charles Dickens